The Biatah language is spoken in the Malaysian state of Sarawak and the Indonesian province of West Kalimantan.  It belongs to the Malayo-Polynesian branch of the Austronesian language family.

Phonology

Consonants 

Vowels 

References

 Topping, Donald M. A Dialect Survey of the Land Dayaks of Sarawak, Language and Oral Traditions in Borneo. 1993. Selected Papers from the First Extraordinary Conference of The Borneo Research Council, Kuching, Sarawak, Malaysia, August 4-9, 1990, pp. 247-274

Agglutinative languages
Languages of Malaysia
Land Dayak languages
Languages of Indonesia